Stelter is a surname. Notable people with the surname include:

 Bernd Stelter (born 1961), German comedian and writer
 Brian Stelter (born 1985), American journalist
 Roland Stelter (born 1953), German author, visual artist, and designer

See also
 Stetler